Giorgos Savvas Georgiadis (born 30 January 1971) is a retired Greek football defender.

References

1971 births
Living people
Greek footballers
Doxa Drama F.C. players
Panathinaikos F.C. players
Aris Thessaloniki F.C. players
OFI Crete F.C. players
A.P.O. Akratitos Ano Liosia players
Ilisiakos F.C. players
Athlitiki Enosi Larissa F.C. players
Agios Dimitrios F.C. players
Super League Greece players
Association football defenders
Greece international footballers
20th-century Greek people
21st-century Greek people